Events in the year 1682 in Norway.

Incumbents
Monarch: Christian V

Events
Stavanger stiftamt headquarters was moved to the town of Christianssand and renamed Christianssand stiftamt.
Kongsvinger Fortress was built.

Births

13 September – Thomas von Westen, priest and missionary (died 1727).
2 October – Birgitte Christine Kaas, poet and translator of hymns (died 1761).

Deaths
21 May - Reinhold von Hoven, military officer (b. c. 1610)

Full date unknown
Paul Peterson Paus, priest and poet (b 1625).
Werner Olsen, church builder (b. c. 1600).

See also

References